Koprivnica is a village situated in Novi Pazar municipality in Serbia. There are 12 people in the village, all ethnic Serbs. Milunka Savić (1888–1973), the most-decorated female combatant in the entire history of warfare, was born in the village.

References

Populated places in Raška District